Dongducheon Station (formerly Dongan) is a metro station located in Dongducheon, South Korea. Seoul Subway Line 1 serves this station, and it is the station right before the northern terminus of Line 1, which is Soyosan. Camp Casey, a U.S. Army military base, is located nearby.

Platforms
 Platform 1: to Ganeung / Seoul Station / Incheon
 Platform 2: to Hoegi (Rapid Line)
 Platform 4: Termination Platform
 Platform 5: No Service (Suspended)
 Platform 6: No Service (Suspended)

Exits
 Exit 1: Dongan Protection Center, Dongducheon Je 2-gyo, Soyo-dong Community Center
 Exit 2: Dongbo Elementary School, Sinheung Middle School, Shinheung High School, Dongducheon Industry Complex, Anheunggyo

References 

Seoul Metropolitan Subway stations
Railway stations in Gyeonggi Province
Railway stations opened in 1912
Metro stations in Dongducheon
Seoul Subway Line 1
1912 establishments in Korea